Okmetic is a Chinese-owned company in Finland that supplies tailored, high value-added silicon wafers to be used in the manufacture of sensors as well as discrete semiconductors and analog circuits. Okmetic has a global customer base and sales network based in Finland, the United States, Japan, China and Hong Kong. In addition, the company has sales agents in China, Korea, Malaysia, Singapore, Taiwan and the United States. The company's headquarters is located in Finland, where the majority of the company's silicon wafers are manufactured.  The company also has contract manufacturing in Japan and China.

Okmetic was listed on Nasdaq Helsinki Ltd under the trading code OKM1V before it was acquired in 2016 by China's National Silicon Industry Group (NSIG).

References

Electronics companies of Finland
Silicon wafer producers
Technology companies of Finland
Electronics companies established in 1985
Technology companies established in 1985
1985 establishments in Finland
Vantaa
Companies formerly listed on Nasdaq Helsinki